Åke Senning (* 14 December 1915 in Rättvik, Sweden; † 21 July 2000 in Zurich, Switzerland) was a Swedish cardiac surgeon who worked at Zurich University Hospital from 1961 until his retirement in 1985.

Biography 
Åke Senning was born to the Swedish veterinarian David Senning and the nurse Elly Senning, née Säfström. He finished his schooling in Uppsala with the baccalaureate. He actually wanted to become an engineer. However, as a nurse in World War 1, his mother persuaded him to study medicine. He subsequently completed the pre-clinical part of his studies in Uppsala, the clinical part and his state examination in Stockholm in 1948. His subsequent further training in Stockholm included general surgery, orthopaedics and thoracic and neurosurgery.

Clarence Crafoord introduced him to the field of cardiac surgery in 1948. The influence of this eminent surgeon, who had a major impact on thoracic and cardiac surgery, sparked Senning's love of cardiac surgery and thus helped determine the direction of his work throughout his life. Åke Senning has always thanked his academic teacher for this and held him in high esteem. With his work on electrically induced ventricular fibrillation to prevent air embolisms in cardiac surgery, he significantly reduced the risk of complications in cardiac surgery. With this, Senning became a private lecturer in Experimental Thoracic and Cardiac Surgery in Stockholm in 1952 and was appointed Extraordinary Professor of Surgery in 1956. In 1957 he was elected senior physician in the Department of Thoracic Surgery at the Karolinska University Hospital (Karolinska Sjukhuset). In 1961, he followed the call to the chair of surgery at the University of Zurich and thus succeeded Theodor Billroth, Rudolf U. Krönlein, Ferdinand Sauerbruch, and Alfred Brunner.

As Alfred Brunner's direct successor, he took up his post on 16 April 1961 as director of the Surgical University Clinic A in Zurich - with over 120 beds and 18 intensive care beds - where he worked with great dedication and energy until his retirement a quarter of a century later on 15 April 1985. In the first nine months of his tenure, 108 heart operations were performed, two years later 264 and in his last year in office 937. In 1969, he performed the first two heart transplantss in Switzerland.  At the beginning of his Zurich days, the lethality rate of patients operated on by heart-lung machine was over 50 per cent and the age limit for such an operation was 35! Ten years later (1979), the lethality rate was less than one per cent, and the age limit was no longer the calendar age, but the biological age of the patients!

After his retirement, he continued to live in Zurich. Together with some of his former colleagues, he was instrumental in setting up the Zurich Hirslanden Heart Centre. All over the world he assisted appointed surgeons and guided them in his heart operations, which are now considered classic. He used the golf club to keep his hands supple, because he had never learned to sit still. With an unusual vitality he survived several operations he had to undergo. It was characteristic of him, for example, that after a serious skiing accident with a broken knee, he operated again the very next day with his leg in plaster.

During his career he published 350 articles in the fields of medical technology, thoracic, cardiovascular and general surgery, kidney and heart transplantation, treatment of vertebral tumours and renal artery stenosis.

He was buried at the Fluntern Cemetery in Zurich.

Scientific achievements 

Heart-lung-machineTurina M., Babotai I., Gattiker R., Senning Å. A heart-lung mashine for newborn infants and infants. Thoraxchir. Vasc. Chir. 1973; 21: 57-67 

It was Clarence Crafoord who put him in a windowless basement room at the Karolinska University Hospital in Stockholm and gave him the task of developing a heart-lung machine, which he succeeded in doing in a relatively short time. This achievement by Senning shows that external working conditions are never general prerequisites for the success of a work. Often - as here - the opposite is the case: external restriction leads to inward concentration. This is how the first heart-lung machine with the roller oxygenator and the associated hypothermia came into being.

Roll Oxygenator 

Senning's personal contributions to the development of cardiac, vascular and thoracic surgery begin as early as 1949 with the development of a Roller Oxygenator, which was successful in animal experiments in 1951 and successfully used in the world's second operation on humans and the first in Europe in 1953.

 Open-heart surgery on humansCrafoord C. Operationen am offenen Herzen mit Herz-Lungen Maschine. Langenbecks Archiv Klin. Chir. 1958; 289: 257-66 

Together with Clarence Crafoord, he performed the first successful open-heart surgery on humans in Europe using the heart-lung machine in 1953.

Implantable heart pacemakerElmqvist R, Senning Å. Implantable pacemaker for the heart. Proceedings of the Second International Conference on Medical Electronics, Paris, France, June 24–27, 1959. London: Iliffe & Son; 1960 

Together with the electrical engineer Rune Elmqvist, Åke Senning developed the first implantable pacemaker in 1958, consisting of two externally rechargeable NiCd cells and a blocking oscillator (pulse amplitude 2.5 V, duration 2 ms, frequency 70 Hz) with two germanium transistors. The components of the first device were placed in a shoe polish box and this was filled with epoxy resin.

When Senning implanted this first implantable pacemaker in the 43-year-old patient Arne Larsson on 8 October 1958 and subsequently developed this invention further, he was asked on several occasions to patent his research results. However, Senning was opposed to any medical patent on the grounds that valuable time would be lost and that the suffering people would only benefit from his idea much later. He repeatedly said: "Medical discoveries belong to the patients and not to the inventor. If we hadn't invented it, someone else would have done it tomorrow". If he had earned even a few francs from each pacemaker, he would have been spared the eternal search for research funds. This innate spontaneous wisdom testifies to Senning's unusual reverence for the sick person. For him, freedom of research and ethics of the researcher were indispensable requirements for medical research.

Arne Larsson, the first pacemaker patient, outlived his surgeon after having to replace 26 pacemakers due to battery exhaustion over the past almost 43 years. He died a year after Senning's death from metastatic melanoma.

Transposition of the great vessels 

The so-called transposition of the great vessels is a congenital malformation in which the aorta is connected to the right and the pulmonary artery to the left ventricle of the heart. In the absence of other malformations, such as an open atrial septal defect or an open ductus arteriosus botalli, the children die shortly after birth. In Senning's neighbour's house in Sweden, a child died of a transposition of the great vessels. Inspired by this sad case, Senning spent all night scribbling drawings on paper that only he could read. With his enormous three-dimensional imagination, Senning's surgical method for correcting transposition of the great vessels was created that night, which was to make history as the Senning operation. The ingenious technical execution could have occurred to someone else, but much more important was Senning's realisation that the right ventricle could also generate systemic pressure. Besides curing numerous children with transposition of the great vessels, this idea also paved the way for many other heart operations.

Electrically induced ventricular fibrillation

As early as 1951, he completed the extracorporeal circuit technique, using electrically induced ventricular fibrillation during cardiac arrest to prevent air embolism and hypothermia to reduce oxygen consumption. Decades later, when asked what was the most important of his inventions, he replied: Electrically induced ventricular fibrillation to prevent air embolism; that saved the most lives! Later it was replaced by drug-induced cardioplegia.

Correction of defective confluence of pulmonary veins with left atrium 

Two years later (1956) he performed the first total correction of a congenital malposition of the junction of the pulmonary veins with the left atrium, and in 1958 the first total correction of a complete transposition of the great vessels mentioned above.

World's first operation on the coronaries using the strip graft technique 

Since 1955, long before the first bypass operation by René Favaloro in Cleveland in 1968, Senning had been experimentally and later clinically involved in coronary surgery. In 1958, he successfully performed the first coronary operation worldwide using the strip-graft technique, i.e. the first endarterectomy of the coronary arteries, which was completed with a vena saphena graft. In the same year, he inserted an implantable pacemaker for the first time, a step that would later save the lives of millions.

Correction of an atrial septal defect

In 1959, he closed an atrial septal defect.

Surgical technique left atrial bypass 

In 1963 followed the first successful use of a left heart bypass, the first step for the LVAD (left ventricular assist device), the artificial left heart, so common today.

Development of an aortic valve replacement 

Together with Donald N. Ross in London, Senning also opened the way for anticoagulation-free follow-up of heart valve patients. Independently and without knowledge of D. Ross' autografting of the pulmonary valve, he developed the technique of aortic valve replacement by free autografts of the fascia lata two months after Ross in October 1962. Together with Martin Rothlin, he was then able to report, in 1971, 141 cases that he had corrected the aortic valve with this surgical method, as well as over 100 cases of mitral valve reconstruction. Again, this was one of his early Zurich achievements that was adopted throughout the world.

Kidney transplants 

Having barely arrived in Switzerland, Senning performed the first kidney transplantation in Switzerland on 17 December 1964 and shortly afterwards published the first major series of over 30 kidney transplants with cadaveric kidneys. Although the typing and organ reservation possibilities as well as the internal post-treatment therapy with immunosuppression were not yet sufficiently developed, his results of the first kidney transplants hardly differed from those of today. It is worth mentioning here that Senning's first kidney transplant series was the first to be published worldwide and that it was groundbreaking for the subsequent Largiadèr era.

Heart transplants 

On 14 April 1969, Senning performed the first heart transplantation in Switzerland, and shortly afterwards the second. He refrained from further heart transplants, stating that a heart transplant was not a surgical problem but a pharmaceutical one. Thus, regular heart transplants were not performed in Züriche until ten years later, when cyclosporine, which brought the clinical breakthrough of heart transplantation, was available. Nevertheless, Senning's already perfected surgical technique of heart transplantation is astonishing. Christiaan Barnard, the great South African heart surgeon, needed seven hours for the first heart transplant, whereas Senning needed three hours for the first and only two hours for the second, and this already in 1969! Senning's students thus opened the way for the introduction of heart transplantation in Switzerland.

Correction of a Budd-Chiari syndrome 

A milestone was the ingenious correction of a Budd-Chiari syndrome, crowned with success in 1981, in which he surgically removed the outflow stenosis of the hepatic veins through the right heart. This opened up a new path for liver surgery. This idea was in turn so groundbreaking that the banal liver puncture, a routine method, has nowadays been replaced by the transvenous, transatrial liver biopsy. This eliminated the risk of intra-abdominal haemorrhage.

Balloon dilatationGeroulanos S. Åke Senning in Memoriam. Intern. J. Artific. Organs 2001; 24 (2): 57-62 

Andreas Grüntzig, who first performed the now widely used coronary balloon dilatation in Zurich on 16 December 1977, needed Senning's assistance because the delicate coronary vessel could rupture during dilatation and the patient could die shortly afterwards. This first balloon dilatation in humans was performed in the animal laboratory of cardiac surgery, which not only had more modern equipment than cardiology, but also the neighbouring animal operating room could be converted at short notice for open-heart surgery in humans. Åke Senning and Marco Turina were standing by next to Grüntzig so that, in the event of a rupture of the coronary artery, they could intervene immediately with the surgical team standing by in the animal experimental laboratory. Andreas Grüntzig never forgot this and always mentioned the importance of Senning in the development of balloon dilatation. His direct superiors would never have allowed him to perform balloon dilatation on the coronary arteries.

Further developments

Similar small and larger advances were also the development of the intra-arterial vascular coil, a precursor of intra-arterial vascular prostheses, together with Dierk Maas, the various pacemaker electrodes together with Istvan Babotai, the baby heart-lung machine together with Babotai and Marco Turina, the left diaphragm replacement with pedicled pericardial valves together with Paul Hahnloser, the technique of kidney transplantation together with Felix Largiadèr and the removal of renal artery stenoses together with Georg Mayor and Ernst Zingg. But also Martin Rothlin, Willy Meier, Ruth Gattiker, O. Läpple, Markus Jenny and many other collaborators contributed ideas which he then put into practice. The small Senning Bulldog clamp, the Senning suction cup, the Senning/Babotai valve of the Siemens respirator, the numerous modifications of the pacemaker electrodes, which finally led to the Babotai Helix electrode.

Furthermore, the Björck's thoracoplasty, which was first performed by Senning while still in Stockholm, and the funnel chest correction according to Senning-Johansson, which was first performed in 1951.

Not to be forgotten are the series of open heart massages in the operating theatre preparation rooms of the early days, the deep hypothermia of infants in a bathtub filled with ice, the more than 120 successful resuscitations since the first coronary patient performed by Eddie Linder in the IPS. Achievements that would not have been possible without Senning's inspiration and enthusiasm.

First intensive care unit in Central Europe

Few people know that the first intensive care unit in Central Europe was installed on 17 April 1961 in three offices of the Surgical Clinic A and that the world's first cardiac surgery intensive care unit, then called the Cardiac Awake Room, was set up in an aft room of the same clinic. Already in the first nine months of his tenure (1961), 108 heart operations were performed and treated post-operatively in this intensive care unit. Two years later there were already 264 and in his last full year in office in 1984 there were 937. With this, too, Senning wrote medical history.

His concept of intensive medicine differed from that of intensive care physicians and anaesthesiologists. Senning was far ahead of his time, because he demanded and enforced that each discipline should have its own intensive care unit. Surgeons, internists, paediatricians and other specialists should continue to look after their patients together with the anaesthetist, as is the case in the operating theatre. For Senning, it was unthinkable to hand over responsibility for his patients for a few hours or days to a third party who had not previously seen the patient. He himself retained responsibility for his patients throughout the entire period of hospitalisation. Thus, several intensive care units with separate management were established in Zurich, such as the cardiac, general and thoracic surgery, medical, traumatology, neurosurgery, gynaecology-obstetrics, urology, paediatrics, neonatology intensive care units and the intensive care unit for burn patients. A concept that is not always readily recognised as a much better one for the highly specialised university hospitals or other tertiary centres. Senning's principle has stood the test of time for tertiary centres. Worldwide, the Haematological, Neonatological, Paediatric, Cardiac, Coronary, Neurosurgical, Traumatological and Burn Intensive Care Units are already self-sufficient in tertiary centres.

Academic teaching 

Senning worked ceaselessly on his own further education, and hardly a holiday or congress went by without him looking over the shoulder of a colleague. Every time he returned from a trip, he reported on it and soon tried out what he had seen. The most impressive thing was how he improved and perfected these techniques! In transmitting the knowledge, the clinical teacher Senning exemplified how the knowledge had to be put into practice. He lacked the many words that are important for the beginner, and he hated the paper that many assistants expected as guidance. Numerous and exemplary, however, were his actions, from which the advanced students benefited extremely. Here the full power of his personality could be fully developed, and the manner of his instructive operating has become an unforgettable experience for a whole generation of young and older surgeons. Senning practised the art of the born teacher, not to work by coercion, but to encourage independent learning. This was the secret of his impact.

The medical profession requires knowledge, ability and personality. For Senning, knowledge and ability were prerequisites for his work, but not the sole content of his personality. This bore the stamp of a unique individuality which, through the inner fusion of knowledge and ability, gave him a personality that those around him could not escape. His students know that truthfulness was his supreme law in research, clinic and teaching. Many suggestions of a scientific nature, which mostly arose from observations at the bedside, emanated from him.

About the person 

Senning was one of the few masters of surgery in general, one of the great clinicians of the old style, who consolidated the reputation of Zurich, but also of Swiss and European medicine in general in the world. He was a born upstream swimmer. He never allowed himself to drift, because he was always aware that things could only go downhill in this way. Senning's ideal was the constant improvement of performance, according to his credo: "Don't give up, try again, try harder".

Senning's actions also included his absolute love of truth. Just as every cover-up in the clinic led to disaster, every admission of a mistake, on the other hand, to friendly, even fatherly advice, he was uncompromising even in matters of truthfulness.

In his private life, he sought recreation in skiing, golf, sailing, dancing (Senning's dancing skills were legendary). At one of the research parties that remained famous, he danced with a female co-worker. She had already been treated for a long time by various doctors for her headaches, but no one had found out what she was suffering from. She was wearing a long dress with a bare back and suddenly fell fainting into his arms. Senning felt the flickering of the subcostally enlarged arteries, the so-called collaterals, on her bare back as she danced and said to her: You have aortic isthmic stenosis; we'll operate on it tomorrow, then you'll be fit again next week. She was operated on a week later, and shortly afterwards she was back in charge of her department. The headaches had disappeared.

Honors and awards 

 1965 Clement Price Thomas Award des Royal College of Surgeons of England
 1965 Olof af Acrel-Preis der Schwedischen Chirurgengesellschaft
 1976 Aachener und Münchener Preis für Technik und angewandte Naturwissenschaften
 1977 René Lériche-Preis der Societé Internationale de Chirurgie
 1978 Prix Mondial Nessim Habif der Universität Genf
 1979 Ernst Jung-Preis für Medizin

The Swedish King honoured Prof. Senning with the Royal Order of the Seraphine (Swedish Kungliga Serafimerorden) as well as the Royal Order of the North Star (Swedish Kungliga Nordstjärneorden).

Memberships 

 1968 Member of the German Academy of Sciences Leopoldina
 1970 Honorary Member of the American College of Surgeons
 1970 Corresponding Member of the American, Chilean and Italian Societies of Surgeons
 1971 Honorary Member of International College for Angiology
 1971 Honorary Member of the British and Irish Society for Thoracic, Cardiac and Vascular Surgery
 1974 Honorary Member of the Rinnovamento Medico in Roma
 1974 Honorary member of the Panhellenic Society of Surgeons in Athens
 1975 Honorary Member of the Royal College of Edinburgh
 1976 Honorary Member of the Royal College of Surgeons of England
 1976 Honorary Member of the Polish Socitety of Surgeons
 1981 Honorary Member of the Egyptic Cardiovascular Socitety
 1982 Honorary Member of the European Cardiovascular Society
 1984 Honorary Member of the German Surgeon Society

Papers (Excerpt) 

 Senning Å., Johansson, L. Korrektur einer Trichterbrust 1951
 Senning Å. Thorakoplastik 1951
 Senning Å. Kammerflimmern während der extrakorporalen Zirkulation als Methode zur Verhinderung von Luftembolien und zur Erleichterung von intrakardialen Operationen. * Acta Chir Scand Suppl 1952; 171: 1-79
 Senning, Å. Kammerflimmern als Methode zur Erleichterung intrakardialer Operationen. Acta Chir Scand. 1952 (suppl), 172
 Senning, Å. Extrakorporale Zirkulation in Kombination mit Hypothermie. Acta Chir. Scand. 1954; 107: 516-24
 Senning Å. Eine Modifikation der Technik zum Verschluss von Vorhofseptumdefekten. Acta Chir. Scand. 1955; 109: 299
 Crafoord C. Norberg B, Senning Å. Klinische Studien zur extrakorporalen Zirkulation mit einer Herz-Lungen-Maschine. Acta chir. Scand. 1957; 112: 220-45
 Crafoord C. Operationen am offenen Herzen mit Herz-Lungen Maschine. Langenbecks Archiv Klin. Chir. 1958; 289: 257-66
 Senning Å. Vollständige Korrektur des anomalen pulmonalen Venenrückflusses. Annals of Surgery 1958; 148: 99-103
 Senning Å. Vollständige Korrektur einer Transposition der großen Arterien. Opuscula medica 1958;
 Senning Å. Operativ behandling av angina pectoris; kirurgiska synpunkter. (Chirurgische Behandlung der Angina pectoris; chirurgische Aspekte). Nord Med. 1958; 60: * 1455-9
 Senning Å. Chirurgische Korrektur der Transposition der großen Gefäße. Chirurgie 1959; 45: 966-80
 Senning Å. Experimentelle Studien zur Chirurgie der Koronararterien, Strip-Graft-Technik (1955) Acta Chir. Scand. 1959; 118: 81-5
 Senning Å., Elmquist R. Konstruktion und Implantation eines Herzschrittmachers (8.10.1958), Second International Conference of Medical Electronics, 1959.
 Senning Å. Chirurgische Korrektur der Transposition der großen Gefäße. Chirurgie. 1959;45(6):966-980.
 Elmqvist R, Senning Å. Implantierbarer Schrittmacher für das Herz. In: Proceedings of the Second International Conference on Medical Electronics, Paris, France, June 24–27, 1959. London: Iliffe & Son; 1960.
 Elmquist R., Senning Å. Implantierbarer Schrittmacher für das Herz. In: Smyth CN. Ed. Medizinische Elektronik. Springfield, Illinois. Charles C. Thomas, 1960, S. * 250.
 Senning Å. Strip Grafting in Koronararterien. J. Thoracic Cardiovasc. Surg. 1961; 41: 542-9
 Senning Å. The Senning-Crafoord heart-lung mashine, zitiert von Galletti P.P., Brecher G. A. Heart-Lung Bypass. New York & London, Grune & Stratton, 1962
 Senning Å. Linksventrikulärer Bypass (1953 ??). Ann. of Surgery 1963; 156: 263-.....
 Senning Å. Fascia lata-Ersatz von Aortenklappen. J. Cardiovasc. Surg.1967; 54: 465-70
 Senning Å. Aktueller Stand der klinischen Herztransplantation. Langenbecks Arch Chir 1971; 329: 799-805.
 Geroulanos S., Hahnloser P., Senning A. Trichterbrustkorrektur: Indikation, chirurgisches Vorgehen und Ergebnisse einer vereinfachten und modifizierten Methode. Helv. Chir. Acta 1974; 41: 101-8
 Senning Å. Transcavale posterokranielle Resektion der Leber zur Behandlung des Budd-Chiari-Syndroms. World J. Surg. 1983; 7: 632-40
 Senning Å, Largiadèr F, Linder E, Scheitlin W. [Homologe Leichennieren 1-3 Jahre nach Transplantation]. Langenbecks Arch Chir. 1968; 322: 528-32.
 Senning Å. Aktueller Stand der klinischen Herztransplantation. Langenbecks Arch Chir 1971; 329: 799-805.
 Turina M., Babotai I., Gattiker R., Senning Å. Eine Herz-Lungen-Maschine für Neugeborene und Säuglinge. Thoraxchir. Vasc. Chir. 1973; 21: 57-67
 Senning Å. Transcavale posterokraniale Resektion der Leber zur Behandlung des Budd-Chiari-Syndroms. World J. Surg. 1983; 7: 632-40
 Larsson B, Elmqvist H, Ryden L, Schuller H. Lessons from the first patient with an implanted pacemaker: 1958-2001. Pacing Clin Electrophysiol. 2003;26(Pt 1): 114-124.

Obituaries 

 Cooley DA. In memoriam. Tribute to Ake Senning, pioneering cardiovascular surgeon. Tex Heart Inst J. 2000;27(3):234-235.
 Geroulanos S. Åke Senning Nachruf Neue Zürcher Zeitung 24.7.2000
 Geroulanos S. Åke Senning in memoriam. Intern. J. Artific. Organs 2001; 24 (2): 57-62
 Turina M. Åke Senning (1915-2000). Cardiol Young. 2000;11:247.
 Largiader F. Professor Åke Senning. 1915-2000. Schweizerische Arztezeitung. 2000;81(36):2030–2031.
 Brunckhorst C, Candinas R, Furman S. Åke Senning 1915-2000. Journal of Pacing & Clinical Electrophysiology, 2000;23(11):1710.

External links 
  a biography and interviews from the Heart Rhythm Society
 
 Professor Åke Senning (1915-2000) on the web site of the University Hospital inZürich
 Hans A. Säuberli: Åke Senning - Pionier der Schweizer Herzchirurgie in Zürich (PDF; 281 kB)
  D. A. Cooley: In memoriam. Tribute to Åke Senning, pioneering cardiovascular surgeon. In: Texas Heart Institute journal. Band 27, Nummer 3, 2000, S. 234-235, PMID 11225587.
 Stephanos Geroulanos: 100-jähriges Jubiläum Åke Senning

References 

1915 births
2000 deaths
Swedish cardiac surgeons
20th-century surgeons